Ernst Eduard Samuel Fraenkel (16 October 1881 – 2 October 1957) was a German linguist who made major contributions to the fields of Indo-European linguistics and Baltic studies.

Life 
Fraenkel was born in Berlin. He began his studies in 1899 in classical philology, Sanskrit, and Indo-European linguistics with Johannes Schmidt at the Humboldt-Universität zu Berlin. In 1905 he defended his dissertation on ancient Greek denominal verbs. From 1906 to 1908 he studied with August Leskien, an expert on the Baltic languages, in Leipzig. He became Privatdozent at the Christian-Albrechts-Universität zu Kiel in 1909, and was promoted to "außerordentlicher Professor" in 1916 and to "ordentlicher Professor" in 1920. Although his parents had converted to Protestantism, his Jewish background prompted his dismissal from the university in 1936 on the basis of the Nuremberg laws, and he was forbidden to publish scholarly works in Nazi Germany.
From 1945 to 1954 he led the Seminar für vergleichende Sprachwissenschaft in Hamburg, where he died.

Works 
 Geschichte der griechischen Nomina agentis auf -ter -tor -tes (-t), I, II, Trübner, Straßburg, 1910-1920;
 Syntax der litauischen Kasus, 1928;
 Die baltischen Sprachen, Carl Winter, Heidelberg, 1950;
 Litauisches etymologisches Wörterbuch, 2 Bde., Carl Winter, Heidelberg/Göttingen, 1962-1965;

External links 
 
 http://www.lituanus.org/1988/88_4_01.htm
 http://www.euro-languages.net/lithuania/?action=LinkingText&id=112 
 

Balticists
Linguists from Germany
Linguists of Lithuanian
Scientists from Berlin
1881 births
1957 deaths
19th-century German Jews
Holocaust survivors
20th-century linguists